Lucie River is a river of Suriname. It feeds into the Atlantic Ocean as well as the Courantyne River. The river was discovered and named by Eilerts de Haan in 1908. Eilerts de Haan is buried near the river.

See also
List of rivers of Suriname

Notes

References
Rand McNally, The New International Atlas, 1993.

Rivers of Suriname